Alexandre may refer to:
 Alexandre (given name)
 Alexandre (surname)
 Alexandre (film)

See also
 Alexander
 Xano (disambiguation), a Portuguese hypocoristic of the name "Alexandre"